Chitral Gol National Park  is one of the National Parks of Pakistan. It is located in Chitral District in Khyber-Pakhtunkhwa province of Pakistan beside the Chitral River, at a distance of two hours drive from Chitral town. The park is also known as Chitral National Park.

Legal status

Up until 1983, Chitral Gol was considered to be the private property of the former Mehtar of Chitral. The status of the park has been in dispute since and has become the issue of ongoing litigation between heirs of the former Mehtar and the Government of Pakistan.

Parameters

The way leading to the park is quite narrow and dangerous, yet more risky during the rainy days. It is located between 1450 metre and about 5000 metre above sea level. It has an area of 7750 hectares.

Fauna
This park includes three valleys. Several glaciers also lie in the park through which several springs make their way and ultimately form a stream which runs 18 kilometres. The cold water of this stream flows towards the east, into the River Chitral. The park is rich in trees particularly cedar trees. The park also serves to provide shelter to a vast bio-diversity, especially markhor, an endangered wild goat species.
Some of the larger mammals found in the park include:
Kashmir Markhor
Siberian ibex
Snow leopard
Ladakh Urial
Himalayan black bear
Himalayan Wolf
Red fox
Eurasian otter
Yellow-throated marten

Weather

The annual rainfall in its region is estimated to be 462 ml. In September, it rains more on the spectacular peaks surrounding the park. However, in November, the rainfall is more in the valleys and on the lower peaks. There is also snowfall during the winter season. The snow-covered white peaks enhance the beauty till June. The general weather is cold and dry. The temperature ranges from −12.2 to 43.3 °C.

Birmoghlasht 

The Birmoghlasht part of the park is where the former Mehtar's Summer Fort is located. At the time of existence of the Chitral State, the Mehtar and his family use to move here in the summer and hold court. The fort was constructed in such a way that it overlooked the entire city. It stands at an elevation of over 2800 meters above sea level. Besides the fort Birmoghlasht also houses a wildlife hut and is a great tourist spot in a few kilometres drive from Chitral town.

Notes

External links
Chitral National Park
Sarhad Tourism Corporation, Government of NWFP, Pakistan

National parks of Pakistan
Chitral District
Protected areas of Khyber Pakhtunkhwa
Parks in Khyber Pakhtunkhwa